Arnaud Boiteau (born 7 November 1973, in Angers) is a French equestrian and Olympic champion. He won a team gold medal in eventing at the 2004 Summer Olympics in Athens.

References

External links

1973 births
Living people
French male equestrians
Olympic equestrians of France
Equestrians at the 2004 Summer Olympics
Olympic gold medalists for France
Event riders
Olympic medalists in equestrian
Medalists at the 2004 Summer Olympics